Monarch Contemporary Art Center and Sculpture Park is an outdoor art gallery located along the Chehalis Western Trail near Tenino, in southern Thurston County, Washington. Opened in 1998 by sculptor Myrna Orsini as "a gift to the community," the  park features sculpture gardens. 

In 1992, after visiting art symposia in Europe, founder Myrna Orsini and her business partner Doris Coonrod purchased land for the park. In 1998, the park opened with a rock-carving symposium, which was attended by 13 artists who came from nine countries, including Lithuania, Austria, Cuba, Italy, and Canada; each artist donated a piece to the park's collection. By 2009, Monarch had established a permanent collection of 28 works, many of which were donated by their creators, and also featured 87 other works on consignment. The park exhibits the work of artists from around the world. Local contributors include Valentine Welman, Justin Hahn, and Tom Yody, and owner Myrna Orsini herself; international artists such as Urs Twellmann and Doug Neil have also displayed their work at the park. 

In the past the park hosted workshops and classes promoting art creation. It also hosted open houses called "Art in the Park," which are biennial exhibitions where local artists display and sell their work; these events feature live music, dancing, and art. There were several distinct areas within the park, including a fantasy garden, a butterfly garden, a maze, and an interactive sound-sculpture area, set in the partially forested countryside. The park also has hosted visiting artists like Pat Warner.

In the summer of 2011, the nonprofit park was set to close due to health and financial concerns, and the property was placed for sale. In July 2011, the month the park would close, a group including the Woodland Trail Greenway Association and civic leaders stepped in to help keep the park open, providing temporary funding for the park's liability insurance and arranging volunteers to manage the landscaping, while looking for a permanent solution for the park's maintenance.

After being closed temporarily, the park reopened in 2017 as a primitive park.

References

External links
Monarch Contemporary Art Center and Sculpture Park - Official Website
Monarch Sculpture Park - Blog
Profile with International Sculpture Center

Sculpture gardens, trails and parks in the United States
Parks in Olympia, Washington
Arts centers in Washington (state)
Art galleries established in 1998
1998 establishments in Washington (state)
Tourist attractions in Olympia, Washington